Delphine Gény-Stephann, (née Gény, born 19 November 1968 in Paris) is a French politician, senior civil servant and business executive. She served as Secretary of State to the Minister of the Economy and Finance, Bruno Le Maire, from 24 November 2017 to 16 October 2018.

Early life and education 
Gény-Stephann is an engineer from the École Polytechnique and the École Nationale des Ponts et Chaussées. She is also a graduate of the MBA of the College of Engineers.

Career
In 1994, Gény-Stephann joined the General Directorate of the Treasury of the Ministry of the Economy and Finance. Between 1999 and 2005, she headed the office at the Agence des participations de l'État. As part of her role in the General Directorate of the Treasury, she sat on the board of directors of several public companies.

In 1999, Gény-Stephann was appointed to represent the State on the board of directors of the Guarantee and Participation Management Company, the Euroméditerranée public development institution and the International Defense Council (DCI). From 1999 to 2001, she sat on the board of directors of the Defence region development board.

In 2001, Gény-Stephann represented the state on the board of directors of several companies in the defense sector, including SNPE, SNECMA, GIAT Industries and CIVI.POL Conseil. She is also appointed to the Board of Directors of La Française des Jeux.

In 2002, Gény-Stephann joined the board of directors of Arte, and in 2003, of France 3 before being replaced in 2004. Until her appointment to the government, she was Vice President of Planning and Strategy for Saint-Gobain.

On November 24, 2017, Gény-Stephann was appointed Secretary of State to the Minister of the Economy and Finance Bruno Le Maire, in Édouard Philippe's second government. She was unknown to the general public at the time of her appointment.

Other activities
 Thales Group, Member of the Board of Directors (-2018)

References 

21st-century French women politicians
École Polytechnique alumni
École des Ponts ParisTech alumni
Living people
1968 births
Government ministers of France